Le Concert d'Astrée is an instrumental and vocal ensemble dedicated to the performance of Baroque music. It was founded In 2000 by Emmanuelle Haïm, and has been in residence at the Opéra de Lille since 2004 and has established an international reputation for the performance of the 17th and 18th century classical repertoire.

Awards
Le Concert d'Astrée was voted "Best Ensemble of the Year" at the Victoires de la musique classique 2003 awards and won the "Alte Musik Ensemble" category at the Echo Deutscher Musikpreis awards in 2008.

Discography
The ensemble has produced the following recordings:

 2002: Arcadian Duets
 2003: Aci, Galatea E Polifemo
 2003: Dido And Aeneas
 2005: Delirio
 2006: Combattimento
 2006: Mass in C, Mozart
 2007: Il Trionfo Del Tempo E Del Disinganno, Handel
 2007: Carestini - The Story Of A Castrato
 2008: Lamenti
 2008: Cantatas BWV 51, 82a & 199, Bach

Funding
The Concert d'Astrée receives funding from the Hauts-de-France Regional Department of Cultural Affairs, the Département du Nord and Lille City Council.

References

Baroque music groups
Early music orchestras
French classical music groups
French instrumental groups
2000 establishments in France
Musical groups established in 2000
Erato Records artists